Butterley Hall is an 18th-century country house near Ripley, Derbyshire. It is a Grade II listed building. The site is now the headquarters of the Derbyshire Constabulary.

The manor of Butterley was owned by Darley Abbey until the Dissolution of the Monasteries in the 16th century.

The two-storey, attic gabled eight-bayed house was built in the late 18th century for the Home family but was sold in 1790 to Francis Beresford for occupation by Benjamin Outram, founder of the Butterley Company. The Hall was the 1803 birthplace of General Sir James Outram of the Indian Army. Following Benjamin Outram's death in 1805 his business partner William Jessop took residence. His grandson, also William Jessop of Butterley Hall, was High Sheriff of Derbyshire in 1878.  From 1892 to 1938 the hall was occupied by Albert Leslie Wright (1862-1938), Chairman and Managing Director of the Butterley Company, and his family.  Like Jessop, Leslie Wright held the office of High Sheriff of Derbyshire in 1919.  His son, Fitzwalter (1902-1957), and grandson John would continue to run Butterley until 1968.

The house later became the head office of the Butterley Company before it was acquired by Derbyshire Police.

See also
Listed buildings in Ripley, Derbyshire

References

   English Heritage, Images of England: Photograph and architectural description
  Magna Britannia, Vol 5 Derbyshire (1817) History of Butterley (Parish of Pentrich) from British History Online

Grade II listed buildings in Derbyshire